The Hanalei Elementary School, on Kuhio Highway in Hanalei, Hawaii, is a public elementary school of the Hawaii Department of Education. It formerly occupied a historic school building that was built in 1926. This building was listed on the Hawaiʻi Register of Historic Places in 1988 and on the National Register of Historic Places in 1990.

The old building was probably designed by Kauai County Department of Public Works employee John Waiamau.  The school is significant as an example of school architectural design that emerged in the 1920s.  The state of Hawaii was planning to demolish the school to make way for a new school on its site;  the building was saved by commercial developers moving it about half a mile down the Kuhio Highway to its current location in Hanalei.

References

External links
 Hanalei School

Public elementary schools in Hawaii
Public schools in Kauai County, Hawaii
School buildings on the National Register of Historic Places in Hawaii
1926 establishments in Hawaii
1920s architecture in the United States
American Craftsman architecture in Hawaii
National Register of Historic Places in Kauai County, Hawaii
School buildings completed in 1926
Hawaii Register of Historic Places